In Hindu temple architecture, a pranala (IAST: praṇāla) is a discharge outlet attached to the wall of the sanctum. It discharges the lustral water or other liquids poured over the idols.

History 

The earliest evidence of the pranalas can be dated to the Shaka-Kushana period in northern India. The pranalas continued to be used in the subsequent years, including the Gupta period. However, the elaborately sculptured pranalas first appear only in the 8th century CE. The pranalas were common in several parts of India; they were less common in the Hindu architecture of Southeast Asia, except in Java.

The pranala is also known as praṇāli, nāla, nāli, gomukha, or nirgama. Some 20th century French archaeologists have used the term "soma-sūtra" to describe the pranala, but Indian texts clearly distinguish between these two terms: a soma-sūtra is a line along which the pranala is placed.

Designs 

Pranalas are used to drain out the abhisheka-teertham water, milk, ghee, etc. poured over the temple idols.

The most common type of pranala in historical temples is the makara-pranala, which is similar to the European gargoyle. It depicts the mythical sea-creature makara (also called graha). The popularity of the makara-pranala probably results from the creature's association with water. The 11th century text Samarangana Sutradhara recommends making a pranali (that is, pranala) drain all around the sanctum, with an outlet in the shape of a graha (or makara). Vishvakarma's Vastushastra, a late 11th century compendium on the Māru-Gurjara architecture, also mentions the pranala. Aparajita-prchchha, dated late 12th to early 13th century, refers to the makara-pranala used to clear the water out of the temple's jagati (platform).

The next most common type of pranala is the grasa-pranala, which depicts the grasa (also known as kirtimukha) mythical creature. The gorgon of the early Greek temples inspired the Indian grasa-pranala, which in turn, inspired the similar motifs in South-East Asia, particularly Java. The grasa-pranala is common in the historical temples of south India; a few examples have also been discovered in Madhya Pradesh, in central India.

The simha-pranala, which depicts a lion, is similar to the grasa-pranala. It is probably inspired by the lion-head spouts that were common in Classical Greek, Hellenistic, and Roman temples. A variation of this form is the simha-nala, which features a tube coming out of a lion's mouth: the tip of the tube may depict another lion's mouth (this type is called simha-mukha-nala), or another object, such as a lotus bud.

Other forms include:

 Bhuta-pranala: depicts a bhuta or jambhaka, a goblin-like creature.
 Ghata-pranala: depicts a ghata or spherical plot, often held by a human figure.
 Marala-pali: depicts the peripheral wall of a house (marala) and a pot (pali) stationed for collecting the drainage water.
 Snapana-griha or Chandesha-griha: A special shrine for a Chandesha (IAST: Caṇḍeśa, a deity); the water from the temple's sanctum is received into this shrine.
 Undecorated nala: These are inornate water spouts; common in temples of Tamil Nadu (especially those from the Chola period).

Pranalas with unique designs also exist: for example, the Koteshwara Temple in Srikakulam has a pranala in which the water spouts out of the bust of a Nandi figure.

Examples 

Some notable examples of the pranala are:

References

Bibliography 

 
 
 

Drainage
Architectural elements
Hindu temple architecture